Nawab Muhammad Taqi Khan Bahadur was Nawab of Masulipatam. He attacked Sisupalgarh town in 1731.

He was the only son of Yusuf Khan Bahadur (brother of Faiz Ali Khan Bahadur). His second son Nawab Hasan Ali Khan Bahadur succeeded him.

Genealogy
His grandfather was Nawab Ali Quli Khan Bahadur, elder son of Faiz Beg Najm-i-Sani, and grandson of Nawab Mirza Muhammad Bakir Khan Najm-i-Sani, sometime Subadar of Multan, Oudh, Orissa, Gujarat and Delhi. Wazir to Emperor Aurangzeb His grandfather was married to a sister of Imad ul-Mulk, Nawab Khwaja Muhammad Mubariz Khan Bahadur, Hizbar Jang, sometime Subadar of the Deccan and Wazir.

His grandfather had three sons,
Fazl Ali Khan Bahadur, Qiladar of Chenchelimala.
Faiz Ali Khan Bahadur, Sometime Qiladar of Banganapalle and Chenchelimala, ancestor of the Nawabs of Banganapalle.
Yusuf Khan Bahadur, his father.

Titles held

See also
Nawab of Carnatic
Nawab of Banganapalle

Nawabs of India